Alexander Winkler Bealer, III, known as Alex W. Bealer (March 6, 1921 – March 17, 1980), was an old-time craftsman of woodworking and blacksmithing from Atlanta, Georgia. He authored The Art of Blacksmithing
Old Ways of Working Wood, The Tools That Built America, and The Successful Craftsman..

References 

1921 births
1980 deaths
American blacksmiths
Writers from Atlanta
American non-fiction writers
Historians of the United States
People from Valdosta, Georgia
Artists from Atlanta
Emory University alumni
United States Marine Corps personnel of World War II
United States Marine Corps personnel of the Korean War
United States Marine Corps officers
Businesspeople from Georgia (U.S. state)
Georgia (U.S. state) Republicans
People from Sandy Springs, Georgia
20th-century American historians
American male non-fiction writers
20th-century American businesspeople
20th-century American male writers
Historians from Georgia (U.S. state)